Our Sunshine is a 1991 novel about Ned Kelly by Australian writer Robert Drewe.

It later served as a source of information for the 2003 film Ned Kelly, directed by Gregor Jordan and starring Heath Ledger, Orlando Bloom, Geoffrey Rush and Naomi Watts.

Awards and nominations 

 1992 shortlisted NBC Banjo Awards — NBC Banjo Award for Fiction 
 1992 shortlisted Miles Franklin Award

1991 Australian novels
Biographical novels
Cultural depictions of Ned Kelly
Australian novels adapted into films
Pan Books books